Family Party is a 2015 coming of age comedy written and directed by Pari Mathur. The film stars Jaya Prasad, Vishal Vaidya, Jai Ahuja, Rahul Nalamasu, and Hunter Milano who are group of teens that decide to sneak out of a family event and go to a local concert. The film was acquired and available to stream on Netflix from 2016-2017.

Synopsis
High school senior, Nick gets forced by his parents to attend a boring family party instead of letting him to go a local summer concert with his baseball buddies. He meets a group of teens—including a girl named Arti—who are all stuck at the party too. They soon realize they all have tickets to the same concert and hash out a plan to sneak out. Their scheme falls apart when they’re met with another jealous childhood friend, a missing diamond necklace, and a small religious ceremony put on by the adults.

Production
Director Pari Mathur completed the script in 2009. The cast was auditioned from the Harker School and Naatak theater group. Principal photography started in August 2013 in Oakland and San Jose, California. Additional scenes were also shot around Saratoga, Pleasanton, and Pacifica.

Family Party was accepted and premiered at the New York Indian Film Festival in 2015. The film was released in October 2015 on iTunes, Google Play, Amazon, and Vudu. It was acquired by Netflix and became available to stream worldwide in all English-speaking territories in early 2016 until March 2017.

Cast
 Jaya Prasad as Arti
 Vishal Vaidya as Nick
 Jai Ahuja as Sahil
 Rahul Nalamasu as Sanjay
 Hunter Milano as Gary
 Shruti Tewari as Rani
 Rajiv Nema as Arjun
 Rashmi Rustagi as Heena
 Dhira Ramakrishnan as Neeta
 Pritesh Shah as Harry
 Karthik Hariharan as Dr. Gupta
 Nitin Deo as the Pundit
 Sareeka Malhotra as Poonum
 Sanjay Pachpande as Vishnu
 Puneet as Gaurav

Accolades
Family Party premiered at the New York Indian Film Festival 2015.

Release
Family Party was released on iTunes, Google Play, Amazon, and Vudu in October 2015. The film was acquired by Netflix and was available to stream in all English-speaking territories worldwide from 2016 to 2017.

Music
The teens in the film are all trying to go to an Eyes on the Shore concert, an actual bay area band, who provided the song for the end credits called “Jigsaw”.

Notes

Films about Indian Americans
Desi films